

Inclusion criteria

This is a list of massacres that have occurred in the purely geographical definition of Great Britain, being in the countries of England, Scotland and Wales and excludes Northern Ireland and massacres in Ireland before independence.

List

References

Great Britain
Massacres

Massacres